{{DISPLAYTITLE:C18H22INO3}}
The molecular formula C18H22INO3 (molar mass: 427.277 g/mol, exact mass: 427.0644 u) may refer to:

 25I-NB3OMe
 25I-NB4OMe
 25I-NBOMe

Molecular formulas